is a Japanese footballer currently playing as a midfielder for Taichung Futuro.

Career statistics

Club
.

Notes

References

External links

1994 births
Living people
Association football people from Shizuoka Prefecture
Japanese footballers
Japanese expatriate footballers
Association football midfielders
J3 League players
Taiwan Football Premier League players
YSCC Yokohama players
Taichung Futuro F.C. players
Japanese expatriate sportspeople in Taiwan
Expatriate footballers in Taiwan